Germantown is the name of three places in the state of Indiana in the United States of America:

 Germantown, Decatur County, Indiana

See also
 East Germantown, Indiana
 Germantown (disambiguation)